Marine Wing Support Group 37 (MWSG-37) was a United States Marine Corps aviation combat service support unit based at Marine Corps Air Station Miramar that was composed of 4 squadrons, that provided the 3rd Marine Aircraft Wing and I Marine Expeditionary Force with complete airfield operation services (less air traffic control), engineer and transportation support, medical assistance, food services, security support, and other direct combat and combat service support to Aviation Combat elements. MWSG-37 was decommissioned on June 15, 2012 but due to operational requirements were reactivated on November 29, 2018.  As part of the Marine Corps' Force Design initiative, MWSG-37 was again decommissioned on July 17, 2020.

Mission
Provide the 3rd Marine Aircraft Wing with organic and deployable combat support and combat service support which is centralized for economy of personnel and equipment.

Subordinate units
 Marine Wing Support Squadron 371
 Marine Wing Support Squadron 372
 Marine Wing Support Squadron 373
 Marine Wing Support Squadron 374

History
The unit was activated on July 1, 1953 at Marine Corps Air Station Miami, Florida as Marine Wing Service Group 37 and was assigned to the 3rd Marine Aircraft Wing.  They relocated during September 1955 to Marine Corps Air Station El Toro, California.  On April 1, 1967 they were re-designated as Marine Wing Support Group 37.

The Group has participated in Operation Desert Storm, Operation Restore Hope

The unit relocated during October 1998 to Marine Corps Air Station Miramar, California, through the Base Realignment and Closure (BRAC) process.

They have participated in Operation Enduring Freedom and Operation Iraqi Freedom from March 2003 to present.

Marine Wing Support Group 37 deactivated on June 15, 2012.
It was reactivated on 29 November 2018 at Marine Corps Air Station Miramar   As part of the re-organization of the Corps, MWSG-37 will be de-activated by 2030.

Unit awards
A unit citation or commendation is an award bestowed upon an organization for the action cited. Members of the unit who participated in said actions are allowed to wear on their uniforms the awarded unit citation. MWSG-37 has been presented with the following awards:

See also

 Organization of the United States Marine Corps
 List of United States Marine Corps wing support groups

References

External links
 MWSG-37's official website

United States Marine Corps wing support groups